Manifestations of Shiva is a 1980 documentary film (90-minute) about the Hindu god Shiva's worship. It carries the performance aspects of Shiva-worship through dance, performing art, visual art and music. The film is directed by Malcolm Leigh and main casting is done by the legendary Kutiyattam (2000-year-old Sanskrit Indian theatre tradition) artist and authority of Abhinaya (the classical Indian acting style) and Natya Shastra scholar - Nātyāchārya Guru Māni Mādhava Chākyār.

See also
Shiva
Māni Mādhava Chākyār
Kutiyattam

Further reading
 Review of Manifestations of Shiva by Prof. L. Erdman, JSTOR Ethnomusicology, Vol. 27, No. 3 (Sep., 1983), pp. 577–579

External links
Joan L. Erdman, JSTOR Ethnomusicology, Vol. 27, No. 3 (Sep., 1983), pp. 577–579
Manifestations of Shiva - British Film Institute page
Manifestations of Shiva. New York Times, December 19, 2007
https://web.archive.org/web/20110716160218/http://afifest.studiosystem.com/project.aspx?projectid=7135
 
 

American documentary films
1980 films
1980 documentary films
Documentary films about Hinduism
1980s English-language films
1980s American films